Clifford Mark Barker (16 April 1917 – 27 July 1942) was a South African first-class cricketer and South African Army officer.

Born in Pinetown in 1917, Barker appeared in one first-class Currie Cup match for Transvaal against the Orange Free State at the Old Wanderers, Johannesburg, on 21 January 1938. During the match, Barker took 2 wickets and was dismissed both innings.

During the Second World War, Barker served as a lieutenant in the 1st Royal Natal Carabineers. Between 26 and 27 July 1942, the unit was involved in defensive actions at Qattara during the First Battle of El Alamein, during which Barker was killed in action on 27 July. He was buried at El Alamein War Cemetery.

References

1917 births
1942 deaths
Sportspeople from KwaZulu-Natal
South African cricketers
KwaZulu-Natal cricketers
South African Army officers
South African military personnel of World War II
South African military personnel killed in World War II